This lists the singles that reached number one on the Spanish PROMUSICAE sales and airplay charts in 2021. Total sales correspond to the data sent by regular contributors to sales volumes and by digital distributors.

Chart history

References 

2021
2021 in Spanish music
Spain songs